Rock Creek is an unincorporated community in Adams County, Illinois, United States. Rock Creek is near the confluence of the stream Rock Creek and Ursa Creek on the edge of the Mississippi River floodplain approximately 7.5 miles north of Quincy and five miles east of La Grange, Missouri.

References

Unincorporated communities in Adams County, Illinois
Unincorporated communities in Illinois